María Lind Sigurðardóttir (born 16 August 1989) is an Icelandic former basketball player. She spent the majority of her career with Haukar with whom she won the national championship in 2009 and the Icelandic Basketball Cup in 2010, when she was also named as the Cup Finals MVP. During a game between Haukar and KR in March 2011, KR's Margrét Kara Sturludóttir struck María in the face with a closed fist. As a result, Margrét Kara was suspended for two games by the Icelandic Basketball Association, a ruling that was criticized by both Haukar and María Lind for being too lenient. In 2016, María transferred to Stjarnan where she would go on to play her final two seasons.

Personal life
María graduated from Kvennaskólinn í Reykjavík at the top of her class in 2009.

References

External links
Icelandic league profile

1989 births
Living people
María Lind Sigurðardóttir
Birna Valgardsdottir
María Lind Sigurðardóttir
María Lind Sigurðardóttir